Kaoru Mfaume is an American-born entertainment producer who has worked extensively in the anime industry. He first worked with Island Pictures in 1995 and then joined Manga Entertainment as an Acquisitions and Production Manager in 1996. He continued to work in Acquisitions until 2005 when he became Managing Director. Some of his high-profile anime projects include Dead Leaves, Blood: The Last Vampire, Street Fighter Alpha: The Animation, Street Fighter Alpha: Generations and Ghost in the Shell: Stand Alone Complex. After leaving Manga Entertainment in 2007, Mfaume founded Endeleizo Co., Ltd, an intellectual property management, production and consultation company. In 2011, he founded Arigato Blueprint, a project supporting communities and institutions that are in need of help in the disaster areas in Japan, following the 2011 Tōhoku earthquake and tsunami.

References

External links
 
 

Living people
American people of Japanese descent
American people of Tanzanian descent
American expatriates in the United Kingdom
American expatriates in Japan
Japanese people of Tanzanian descent
Year of birth missing (living people)